The 1923 Rochester Jeffersons season was their fourth in the league. The team equaled their previous output of 0–4–1, going 0–4. They tied for nineteenth place in the league.

Schedule

Standings

References

Rochester Jeffersons seasons
Rochester Jeffersons
Rochester
National Football League winless seasons